Zawedde Emma Ashton  (born 25 July 1984) is a British actress, playwright and narrator. She is best known for her roles in the comedy dramas Fresh Meat and Not Safe for Work, the Netflix horror thriller film Velvet Buzzsaw and for her portrayal of Joyce Carol Vincent in Dreams of a Life (2011). She will join the Marvel Cinematic Universe as a villain in The Marvels (2023).

Early life
Ashton was born in Hackney, London, on 25 July 1984. She is the eldest of three children born to a Ugandan mother, Victoria, and an English father, Paul Ashton. She attended the Anna Scher Theatre School from the age of six and was a member of the National Youth Theatre. She gained her degree in acting at the Manchester School of Theatre. Her maternal grandfather, Paulo Muwanga, was formerly President and Prime Minister of Uganda.

Career

Acting
Her theatre credits include Harold Pinter's Betrayal at The Harold Pinter Theatre, London and the Bernard B. Jacob's Theatre, Broadway. Rhinoceros, The Arsonists, Gone Too Far! (Royal Court), Othello (Globe Theatre), Frontline (Globe Theatre), All The Little Things We Crushed (Almeida), This Wide Night (Soho Theatre), Michael Frayn's comedy Here (The Rose Theatre Kingston), Abi Morgan’s Splendour (Donmar Warehouse), Jean Genet's The Maids (Trafalgar Studios), Salome in Salome (Headlong Theatre / Hampstead Theatre). In June 2010 Ashton was awarded 2nd prize at the Ian Charleson Awards for her classical performance in Salome.

Her film credits include Velvet Buzzsaw, directed by Dan Gilroy for Netflix, Dreams of a Life directed by Carol Morley, for which she was nominated in the Most Promising Newcomer category at the 2012 British Independent Film Awards, St. Trinian's 2: The Legend of Fritton's Gold, Blitz, Nocturnal Animals, directed by Tom Ford, Greta directed by Neil Jordan.

Her TV credits include Vod in the Channel 4 comedy Fresh Meat, Claire in the six-part BBC One / Netflix series Wanderlust, Journey Blue in Doctor Who, BBC, and Katherine in Not Safe For Work for Channel 4. As a child, Ashton appeared in two episodes of The Demon Headmaster.

In February 2021 it was announced that she would play a villain in The Marvels. It is scheduled to be released on 28 July 2023.

Awards 
In May 2010, Ashton was named as one of the "55 faces of the future" by Nylon magazine's Young Hollywood Issue. In October 2012, she was awarded the "Ultimate Newcomer" trophy by Cosmopolitan magazine at their Women of the Year awards. In November 2012 Ashton picked up the Creative Diversity Network Award for Best Breakthrough On-Screen Talent for her role as Vod in the BAFTA-nominated Channel 4 hit Fresh Meat. In 2013, Ashton won a Screen Nation Award for Female Performance in a Film 2012/2013, in recognition of her lead role performance in Dreams of a Life.

Writing
Ashton began entering poetry slams at the age of seventeen, and won the London Poetry Slam Championship in 2000. In 2006 she was Young Writer in Residence at the Contact Theatre in Manchester. Her first play, Harm's Way, was shortlisted for the Verity Bargate Award in 2007, and premiered at the Lowry, Salford in 2008 as part of the National Youth Theatre’s new writing season. Her other plays have included Skunk, performed by the National Youth Theatre and Soho Theatre; and She from the Sea, performed in 2010 at the London International Festival of Theatre (LIFT). Ashton was co-writer of Suddenlossofdignity.com, Bush Futures Programme. One of her plays, For all the Women Who Thought They Were Mad, was selected to be part of the Royal Court Playwriting Festival in 2009. Ashton contributed to the writing of The Children's Monologues, adapted from over 300 original stories by Tswana, Zulu and Sesotho children in South Africa and presented by Dramatic Need in 2010. She has worked with the Bush Theatre and the Clean Break theatre company.

In 2019, Ashton published her first book, Character Breakdown, a fictionalized memoir based on her experiences as an actress.

She was elected a Fellow of the Royal Society of Literature in July 2021.

Other work
Ashton narrated thirteen episodes of 24 Hours in Police Custody, shown on Channel 4 in 2016 and 2017. She narrated a documentary Public Enemies: Jay-Z vs Kanye for the same channel in 2017.

In 2017, Ashton presented the third series of Random Acts, Channel 4's short film showcase in association with Arts Council England. Episode 2 included a film directed by Ashton, in which she took the lead role.

Personal life

In March 2022, it was announced that Ashton is engaged to English actor Tom Hiddleston. The two co-starred in the 2019 play Betrayal. In June 2022, it was revealed they are expecting their first child.

Acting credits

Film

Television

Theatre

References

External links

1984 births
Actresses from London
Alumni of City and Islington College
Alumni of Manchester Metropolitan University
Black British actresses
English child actresses
English film actresses
English people of Ugandan descent
English radio actresses
English Shakespearean actresses
English stage actresses
English television actresses
English voice actresses
English women dramatists and playwrights
Fellows of the Royal Society of Literature
Living people
National Youth Theatre members
People from Hackney Central